Chetone mimica is a moth of the family Erebidae. It was described by Arthur Gardiner Butler in 1874. It is found in Colombia and Venezuela.

References

Chetone
Moths described in 1871